CFWN-FM is a community radio station broadcasting at 89.7 MHz (FM) in Port Hope, Ontario, Canada.

History
On November 10, 2011, Small Town Radio (STR) received an approval from the Canadian Radio-television and Telecommunications Commission (CRTC) for a new english-language community FM radio station to serve West Northumberland at 89.7 MHz with an effective radiated power of 700 watts.

References

External links
northumberland897.ca
 

Fwn
Fwn
Radio stations established in 2011
2011 establishments in Ontario